"Pour que tu m'aimes encore" is a French-language song by Canadian singer Celine Dion, recorded for her French studio album, D'eux (1995). It was released as the lead single on 13 March 1995 in Francophone countries and in September 1995 in other European countries. In Canada it was a radio only release. The song was also released in Japan in October 1996. According to Dion, it is the biggest song of her French career. She also recorded it in English as "If That's What it Takes" and included it on her 1996 album, Falling into You.

Background and release
"Pour que tu m'aimes encore" was written and produced by Jean-Jacques Goldman and became one of Dion's signature songs. The lyrics are sung from the viewpoint of a woman who is pleading with her ex-lover that she would do anything for him to love her again.

Commercial performance and awards
"Pour que tu m'aimes encore" became a smash hit in France, where it topped the singles chart for 12 weeks, sold one million copies (platinum award), and became 1995's best-selling single and 1995's number-one airplay song. It spent 15 weeks at the top in Belgium Wallonia and 4 weeks in Quebec. It was certified Platinum in Belgium. "Pour que tu m'aimes encore" also reached top 10 in the United Kingdom and Ireland, which was an exceptional achievement for a song in French. According to Virgin17, the single has sold more than 4,000,000 copies, worldwide. In Germany, Austria and Switzerland, "Pour que tu m'aimes encore" charted in 2011, 2012 and 2013, after it was performed on the German Show Das Supertalent by Juliette Schoppmann.

In 2015, the popularity of the song helped it reach #5 on Billboard's France Digital Songs Sales Chart, twenty years later since it was first released.

The song received a Félix Award for Song of the Year, as well as an award from Trophée Radio France Internationale for "
Conseil Francophone de la Chanson". The song also won an award by the Victoires de la Musique for "Best Song of the Year".

Since 2012, "Pour que tu m'aimes encore" enters the Belgium Wallonia Back Catalogue Year-end Chart every year.

Critical reception
Writing for Dotmusic, James Masterton viewed the song as a "gorgeous ballad". Pan-European magazine Music & Media wrote, "It would be indecent to refuse this Jean-Jaques Goldman-written romantic ballad with a solid beat just because it's in French. Whatever the language, Dion always lets her heart speak". A reviewer from Music Week rated the song three out of five, adding, "You need the words for this slushy stuff so Dion's return to her native tongue will temper the chances of this song in the UK, beautifully sung though it is".

Music video
A music video was produced to promote the single, directed by Michel Meyer. It was later included on Dion's DVD On ne change pas (2005). On 27 March 2020, the music video has been remastered in HD quality. It was later published on Dion's official YouTube channel in August 2012. The video has amassed more than 174 million views as of November 2022.

Other versions and covers
The song was later included in four of Dion's live albums, Live à Paris, Au cœur du stade, Taking Chances World Tour: The Concert (French edition), and Céline une seule fois / Live 2013.  The song was also featured on three compilation albums including, The Collector's Series, Volume One, On ne change pas, and My Love: Ultimate Essential Collection.

Live performances
Dion performed the song during her D'eux Tour in 1995, her 1996-97 Falling Into You Around the World Tour, her Let's Talk About Love World Tour in 1998–99, during her first Las Vegas residency show A New Day... at Caesars Palace, Las Vegas 2003/2007 and as well as during her 2008-09 Taking Chances World Tour. She also performed the song at Céline sur les Plaines, which was a concert for Quebec City's 400th anniversary. In 2005, Dion recorded a live version with 500 choristers for the album 500 Choristes avec.... Dion also performed this song during her Summer Tour 2016, in the 2017 European tour, the 2018 tour, and the final year of her Las Vegas residency show, Celine. Dion performed "Pour que tu m'aimes encore" during her BST Hyde Park concert in London on 5 July 2019 and select dates of her Courage World Tour.

"Pour que tu m'aimes encore" was covered in 2000 by Elsa Lunghini, Liane Foly and Hélène Segara on the number-on album Les Enfoirés en 2000. Nigerian singer Funke Olayode recorded a Yoruba version re-entitled "To ba J’oun To Gba" in 2001. It was also covered by the operatic pop group Il Divo in November 2005, on their second album Ancora. In November 2006, the music producer Antonis Karalis released his debut worldwide single "To Be Continued" with the Greek version of "Pour que tu m'aimes encore", called "S'Agapo Sa Trelos". The tune has a rock arrangement that combines baglamas and electric guitars. In May 2007, Elena Paparizou released her new single "Fos" with another Greek version of the song called "An Esy M'agapas". Les Sœurs Boulay released an acoustic cover in 2016.

Formats and track listings

European 7", 12" and CD single
"Pour que tu m'aimes encore" – 4:15
"Pour que tu m'aimes encore" (Instrumental) – 4:16

European CD maxi-single
"Pour que tu m'aimes encore" – 4:15
"Pour que tu m'aimes encore" (Instrumental) – 4:16
"Calling You" (Live) – 4:04

European CD maxi-single #2
"Pour que tu m'aimes encore" – 4:15
"Pour que tu m'aimes encore" (Instrumental) – 4:16
"Prière païenne" – 4:11

Japanese 3" single
"Pour que tu m'aimes encore" – 4:15
"Prière païenne" – 4:11

UK cassette single
"Pour que tu m'aimes encore" – 4:15
"Show Some Emotion" – 4:11

UK CD maxi-single
"Pour que tu m'aimes encore" – 4:15
"Send Me a Lover" – 4:31
"Show Some Emotion" – 4:11
"The Last to Know" – 4:35

UK CD maxi-single #2
"Pour que tu m'aimes encore" – 4:15
"Prière païenne" – 4:11
"Un garçon pas comme les autres (Ziggy)" – 2:58
"Des mots qui sonnent" – 3:56

Charts

Weekly charts

Year-end charts

Decade-end charts

All-time charts

Certifications and sales

Release history

See also

Félix Award
French Top 100 singles of the 1990s
List of best-selling singles in France
List of number-one singles of 1995 (France)
List of UK top-ten singles in 1995
Ultratop 40 number-one hits of 1995
Victoires de la Musique

References

External links

1995 singles
1995 songs
1990s ballads
Celine Dion songs
French-language songs
Il Divo songs
Pop ballads
SNEP Top Singles number-one singles
Songs written by Jean-Jacques Goldman
Ultratop 50 Singles (Wallonia) number-one singles
Torch songs